The 1935 Italian Grand Prix was a Grand Prix motor race held at Monza on 8 September 1935.

Classification

Notes
 Paul Pietsch and René Dreyfus were called in so that Bernd Rosemeyer and Tazio Nuvolari, respectively, could take over their cars.

Italian Grand Prix
Italian Grand Prix
Grand Prix